Mahvelat-e Jonubi Rural District is a rural district (dehestan) in the Central District of Mahvelat County, Razavi Khorasan province, Iran. At the 2006 census, its population was 7,794, in 2,041 families.  The rural district has 48 villages. The capital of the rural district is the village of Mehneh.

References 

Rural Districts of Razavi Khorasan Province
Mahvelat County